Alamcode may refer to:

Alamcode, Malappuram, Kerala, India
Alamcode, Thiruvananthapuram, Kerala, India